Actinidia tetramera (四萼猕猴桃 si e mi hou tao) is a species of flowering plant belonging to the family Actinidiaceae, that is native to Central China. The ovate leaves are dark green with bright white flashes on the surface. The species is dioecious, meaning that male and female plants are separate. Fruit is only borne on a fertilised female plant.

This plant is valued in cultivation for its ornamental qualities. It prefers a sheltered spot in sun or partial shade. In the UK, the variety A. tetramera var. maloides has gained the Royal Horticultural Society's Award of Garden Merit.

Varieties
 Actinidia tetramera var. badongensis
 Actinidia tetramera var. maloides
 Actinidia tetramera var. tetramera

References

tetramera
Flora of China